FMH College of Medicine and Dentistry (abbreviated as FMHCMD), established in 2001, is a private college of medicine and dentistry located in Shadman, Lahore, Punjab, Pakistan. The college is part of the Fatima Memorial System, accredited by the Pakistan Medical and Dental Council and registered with the World Health Organization, Avicenna Directories and International Medical Education Directory. It is affiliated with the University of Health Sciences, Lahore.

The neighboring Fatima Memorial Hospital is attached to the college as a teaching and training hospital.

Attached Hospitals
Following hospitals are attached with FMHCMD for clinical training:
Fatima Memorial Hospital
Hijaz Hospital
Khair-Un-Nisa Hospital

Medical School
The medical school of FMHCMD takes in 150 students every year on the basis of MDCAT scores as well as conducting their own test. The affiliated hospitals provide immense clinical exposure to the medical students as well as giving them the ability to interact with the patients during their pre-clinical years. The Anatomy and Histology department of FMH College of Medicine and Dentistry has two major areas of activity; education and research. Both these activities of the department occur in well-equipped laboratories. Cadaver dissection is a primary teaching method in the subject of gross anatomy, which is accomplished in a well-ventilated dissection hall comprising 10-dissection stations and two mortuary plants, accommodating six bodies each. Following departments are included in medical school:

 Department of Anesthesia
 Department of Anatomy
 Department of Biochemistry
 Department of Community Health Sciences
 Department of Cardiology
 Department of Dermatology
 Department of Family Medicine
 Department of Forensic Medicine
 Department of Gastroenterology
 Department of Obstetrics and Gynaecology
 Department of General Surgery
 Department of Medicine
 Department of Nephrology
 Department of Neurology
 Department of Orthopedic
 Department of Ophthalmology
 Department of Otorhinolaryngology
 Department of Physiology
 Department of Pharmacology and Therapeutics
 Department of Pulmonology
 Department of Paediatrics
 Department of Pathology
 Department of Psychiatry
 Department of Rheumatology
 Department of Radiology
 Department of Urology

Dental School
FMH has one of the best dental schools in the private sector of Pakistan, giving admission to 75 students per year. It has an outstanding dental faculty and provides immense clinical exposure which gives students the chance to improve their clinical skills. The purpose built departments of medical sciences are well equipped and manned by highly qualified and experienced teachers. Pre-clinical dental practical training is imparted to the students in well-equipped Prosthodontics, Phantom Head, Oral Anatomy and Oral Pathology Laboratories Right from the start efforts are made to develop knowledge based clinical skills so as to achieve integration of the curriculum set by the University of Health Sciences. This helps to improve the practical application of knowledge and improves the recall memory of the students. Unlike in the past, whereby basic and clinical sciences were spaced by a few years, the newly designed curriculum helps to achieve a better transition from basic to the clinical sciences. The transition is greatly facilitated by pre-clinical year demonstrations and introduction to clinical techniques before the actual onset of clinical training. Following departments are included in dental school:

 Department of Anatomy
 Department of Biochemistry
 Department of Operative Dentistry
 Department of Oral Biology
 Department of Oral Medicine, Dental Diagnostics and Dental Radiology
 Department of Orthodontics
 Department of Oral and Maxilofacial Surgery
 Department of Oral Community and Preventive Dentistry
 Department of Physiology
 Department of Prosthodontics
 Department of Oral Pathology
 Department of Pharmacology and Therapeutics
 Department of Periodontology
 Department of Science of Dental Material

Campus
FMH College of Medicine and Dentistry gives admission to 150 MBBS and 75 BDS students each year, as of 2013. The campus of the college holds near 1000 students. It is equipped with lecture halls, laboratories, museums, an auditorium and a cafeteria. The learning resource center consists of a Library and a state of the art fully air-conditioned Computer lab with one hundred (100)-computer workstations providing all facilities essential for the students, faculty and staff. High speed Internet connectivity as well as online research journals availability is just a few of the facilities available in this computer lab. The Campus has an extremely advanced system of Wi-Fi connectivity and students can access the internet anytime, anywhere.

Events
Lahore Debating Gala (President: M. Haris Idrees and Mishaim Khan)
Arthur C. Guyton Physiology Quest (President: Muhammad Bin Muddassir)
Tasawur - Arts and Photography Competition (President: Rahim Arshad and Mahrukh)
Dramatics Event (President: Momna Anwaar Pannun)
Sports Day (President: Aymen Tariq)

References

External links
  

Universities and colleges in Lahore
Medical colleges in Punjab, Pakistan
Dental schools in Pakistan